Will Sands (born July 6, 2000) is an American professional soccer player who plays as a midfielder for Major League Soccer club Columbus Crew.

Youth and college career 
Sands played for New York City FC affiliate club New York Soccer Club before joining New York City FC's academy upon the creation of their U-16 Academy team in 2015. Sands was part of the New York City FC academy system from 2015 until 2019. He played college soccer at Georgetown from 2019 to 2021. During his time with the Hoyas, he made 56 appearances and scored 4 goals. He helped the team win the 2019 NCAA College Cup and two Big East Tournaments.

Sands played for Manhattan SC of USL League Two in 2021, playing in 10 games and scoring 4 goals.

Professional career 
On January 21, 2022, Sands was announced as a homegrown player signing by Columbus Crew after a trade with New York City FC for his homegrown rights. Sands made his professional debut for the Columbus Crew organization for the team's reserve side, Columbus Crew 2, in a 1–0 win against Philadelphia Union II. He subsequently made his first team debut in a 2–1 loss against USL Championship side Detroit City FC in the U.S. Open Cup.

Personal life 
Sands is the twin brother of James Sands, who currently plays for New York City FC, and the United States men's national soccer team.

Honors 
Georgetown Hoyas
NCAA College Cup: 2019

References

External links 

 Will Sands at Georgetown Athletics
 

2000 births
American soccer players
Association football midfielders
Association football defenders
Columbus Crew players
Homegrown Players (MLS)
Living people
Soccer players from New York (state)
USL League Two players
Georgetown Hoyas men's soccer players
Major League Soccer players
Columbus Crew 2 players
MLS Next Pro players